In mathematics, the Kummer–Vandiver conjecture, or Vandiver conjecture, states that a prime p does not divide the class number hK of  the maximal real subfield   of the p-th cyclotomic field. 

As of 2011, there is no particularly strong evidence either for or against the conjecture and it is unclear whether it is true or false, though it is likely that counterexamples are very rare.

Background

The class number h of the cyclotomic field   is a product of two integers h1 and h2, called the first and second factors of the class number, where h2 is the class number of  the maximal real subfield   of the p-th cyclotomic field. The first factor h1 is well understood and can be computed easily in terms of Bernoulli numbers, and is usually rather large. The second factor h2 is not well understood and is hard to compute explicitly, and in the cases when it has been computed it is usually small.

Kummer showed that if a prime p does not divide the class number h, then Fermat's Last Theorem holds for exponent p.

The Kummer–Vandiver conjecture states that p does not divide the second factor h2.
Kummer showed that if p divides the second factor, then it also divides the first factor. In particular the Kummer–Vandiver conjecture holds for regular primes (those for which p does not divide the first factor).

Evidence for and against the Kummer–Vandiver conjecture

Kummer verified the Kummer–Vandiver conjecture for p less than 200, and Vandiver extended this to p less than 600. 
 verified it for p < 12 million.  extended this to primes less than 163 million, and  extended this to primes less than 231.

 describes an informal probability argument, based on rather dubious assumptions about the equidistribution of class numbers mod p,  suggesting that the number of primes less than x that are exceptions to the Kummer–Vandiver conjecture might grow like (1/2)log log x. This grows extremely slowly, and suggests that the computer calculations do not provide much evidence for Vandiver's conjecture: for example, the probability argument (combined with the calculations for small primes) suggests that one should only expect about 1 counterexample in the first 10100 primes, suggesting that it is unlikely any counterexample will be found by further brute force searches even if there are an infinite number of exceptions.

 gave conjectural calculations of the class numbers of real cyclotomic fields for primes up to 10000, which strongly suggest that the class numbers are not randomly distributed mod p. They tend to be quite small and are often just 1. For example, assuming the generalized Riemann hypothesis, the class number of the real cyclotomic field for the prime p is 1 for p<163, and divisible by 4 for p=163. This suggests that Washington's informal probability argument against the conjecture may be misleading.

 gave a refined version of Washington's heuristic argument, suggesting that the Kummer–Vandiver conjecture is probably true.

Consequences of the Kummer–Vandiver conjecture
 showed that the conjecture is equivalent to a statement in the algebraic K-theory of the integers, namely that  Kn(Z) = 0 whenever n is a multiple of 4. In fact from the Kummer–Vandiver conjecture and the norm residue isomorphism theorem follow a full conjectural calculation of the K-groups for all values of n; see Quillen–Lichtenbaum conjecture for details.

See also

 Regular and irregular primes
 Herbrand–Ribet theorem

References 

 

Cyclotomic fields
Conjectures
Unsolved problems in number theory
Algebraic number theory